Refuge de la Fournache is a refuge of Savoie, France. It lies in the Massif de la Vanoise range. It has an altitude of  2330 metres above sea level.

Mountain huts in the Alps
Mountain huts in France